Paracles juruana is a moth of the subfamily Arctiinae first described by Arthur Gardiner Butler in 1878. It is found in Amazon rainforest of Brazil.

References

Moths described in 1878
Paracles